The Staffordshire County Senior League is a football competition based in Staffordshire, England. It was formed in 2005 as a merger of the Midland League (formerly known as the Staffordshire Senior League) and the Staffordshire County League.

The former Midland League clubs formed the new Premier Division, which is a feeder to the North West Counties Football League and sits at step 7 (or level 11) of the National League System. The former Staffordshire County League sides formed Division One and Division Two, which are at levels 12 and 13 of the English football league system.

The league operates three divisions, the Premier Division, which sits at Step 7 of the English football league system, Division One, and Division Two. For three seasons, 2014–15 to 2016–17, Division Two was regionalised into separate North and South divisions, but these were merged back into a single division for season 2017–18. As of the 2022-23 season, however, the merger was reversed and Division Two split back into North and South subdivisions.

Tunstall Town received national and even international attention in the 2010–11 season, after losing all of their games, and conceding an average of close to ten goals a game; however the team's first eleven did consist of players as old as 75. On 22 February 2014, they ended a 171-game winless run with a 3-2 victory over Betley Reserves.

Past winners

Premier Division

Division One

Division Two

Division Two (North and South)

Division Two

Member clubs (2022–23 season)
Source:

Premier Division
Abbey Hulton United Reserves
AFC Alsager
Alsager Town Reserves
Ashbourne
Audley & District
Ball Haye Green
Brereton Social 
Buxton Development
City of Stoke
Eastwood Hanley 
FC 41
Leek C.S.O.B.
Lichfield City Casuals
Milton United
Redgate Clayton
Silverdale Athletic
Walsall Phoenix
Wolstanton United

Division One
Audley & District 2nd
Cheadle Town Eleven
Chesterton AFC (Sat)
City of Stoke Sen
Cresswell Wanderers
Eastwood Hanley Reserves
Florence Youth
Hawkins Sports (Sat)
Keele University
Kidsgrove Athletic
Madeley White Star
Newcastle Town Reserve
Redgate Clayton Reserves
Stone Old Alleynians 2nd
Uttoxeter Town Reserves

Division Two North
AFC Alsager Development
Ashbourne Reserves
Audrey & District Development
Ball Haye Green Reserves
FC 41 Reserves
Florence Youth Reserves
Keele University 2nd
Leek C.S.O.B. Reserves
Milton United Reserves
Stone Old Alleynians 'A'

Division Two South
AFC Real Medina
Albrighton
Brereton Social Reserves
Cannock United
Huthman
Stafford Town Development
Three Spires United
Walsall Phoenix Reserves
Warstones Wanderers Reserves
Wyrley Reserves

References

External links
, FA Full-Time

 
2005 establishments in England
Football in Staffordshire
Football leagues in England
Sports leagues established in 2005